Sithulpawwa Rajamaha Viharaya is an ancient Buddhist monastery located in Hambantota District, South Eastern Sri Lanka.  Situated 18 km east of the pilgrimage town Katharagama, it is believed to have been built in the 2nd century B.C by king Kavantissa. Sithulpawwa Vihara can be reached by travelling 18 miles along the Tissamaharama-Yodhakandiya road towards the Yala National Park. The name Sithulpawwa is derived from the word "Chiththala Pabbatha", which means "the hill of the quiet mind".

This monastery was a place of worship for devotees as well as a center of Buddhist education for Buddhist monks. Paintings of the Anuradhapura era and the ruins of stone Buddha images, Bodhisattva images, Image Houses, Circular Relic Houses are spread throughout the monastery premises. The present chief incumbent of Sithulpawwa Rajamaha Vihara is Ven. Metaramba Hemarathana Nayake Thera.
King Gajabahu placed a stone inscription where it states that the tax received from the court must be paid to the monks of this monastery.

See also
 Thissamaharama Viharaya
 Yatala Vehera

References

External links
Sithulpawwa

Buddhist temples in Hambantota District
Stupas in Sri Lanka
Archaeological protected monuments in Hambantota District